Battley is a surname, and may refer to:

David Battley (1935–2003), British actor
Devin Battley, American motorcycle racer and businessman
John Battley (1880–1952), British politician
Philip Battley, English actor
Richard Battley (1770–1856), English chemist

See also
 Batley (surname)
 Bailey (surname)
 Batey (surname)
 Bagley (surname)
 Barley (surname)
 Bayley (surname)
 Badley (surname)
 Baxley (surname)

Surnames
Surnames of British Isles origin
Surnames of English origin
English-language surnames